Marsupilami were an English progressive rock band active in the early 1970s. Their name was taken from a famous Belgian comics character created by Belgian artist André Franquin. In 1969, the band toured with Deep Purple, and played at the opening of the Isle of Wight Festival when King Crimson withdrew. They released two albums, Marsupilami (1970) and Arena (1971), on Transatlantic Records. Thealbums were reissued on Cherry Red Records in 2007. The band briefly reunited for gigs in 2011.

Personnel
Mike Fouracre – Drums
Fred Hasson – Vocals, harmonica, words and music
Leary Hasson – Keyboards and music
Richard Lathom Hicks – Bass
Dave Laverock – Guitar, vocals, words and music
Jessica Stanley Clarke – Flute and vocals
Peter Bardens – Percussion and producer of Arena
Mandi Riedelbauch – Woodwinds on 'Arena'
Bob West – Vocals and words on 'Arena'
Paul Dunmall – Tenor and soprano saxes and flute

Discography
Marsupilami (Transatlantic TRA 213) 1970
Arena (Transatlantic TRA 230) 1971

After Marsupilami
Singer Jessica Stanley Clarke later became known as Jekka McVicar, who is one of the UK's best-known organic gardening experts, and proprietor of Jekka's Herb Farm near Bristol.

Fred Hasson has followed a career in media industries – TV, dotcom and video games, but can sometimes be seen at jam sessions in London playing harmonica.

Leary Hasson still lives on the farm the band rehearsed in, and still plays in a number of local outfits.

Bob West is now an artist living in France.

Mike Fouracre works at the Arts Council.

Paul Dunmall is still playing on the free jazz circuit with Keith Tippett and others.

References

External links
Official website (inactive)
[ Discography] at Allmusic
Marsupilami at The Tapestry of Delights

English progressive rock groups